Christoph Dieckmann may refer to:
Christoph Dieckmann (beach volleyball) (born 1976), German beach volleyball player
Christoph Dieckmann (writer) (born 1956), German journalist, commentator and author
Christoph Dieckmann (historian) (born 1960), German historian and author